Nkowankowa is a township in the Greater Tzaneen Local Municipality of the Mopani District Municipality in the Limpopo province of South Africa. It is home to soccer development team called Nkowankowa Barcelona FC and Ritavi cross warriors athletics club

The township hosts one of the biggest industrial parks located in a Township around the country, with more than 40  industrial factories producing a variety of goods from school furniture to steel.

Education

Nkowankowa has various primary and secondary schools:

Dududu Primary School
Nkowankowa Lower Primary School
Masungulo Primary School
Ritavi Primary School
Bombeleni Primary School
Bankuna High School
Hudson Ntsanwisi Senior Secondary School
DZJ Mthebule High School
Progress High School
Meridian College
St George's College

Notable residents 
Former Limpopo premier and now deputy minister of police, Cassel Mathale, former public protector, Lawrence Mushwana, 2019 Limpopo Sports Awards nominee Gladwin Khosa (Blue Bulls Rugby Union/Limpopo), Ebony Khama, long distance runner Samuel Ntsan'wisi and also upcoming sprinter Tiyani Mitshabe come from Nkowankowa.

Notable shops in Nkowankowa include: Highpoint Supermarket and Restaurant, Muyi Enterprise, Miami Chicken Grill, Chisa Grill and Chicken Kwasa.

References

Populated places in the Greater Tzaneen Local Municipality